Anand Narain Mulla (October 1901 – 13 June 1997) was an Indian Urdu poet. He served as a Member of Parliament in both the Lok Sabha and the Rajya Sabha.

Life
Anand Narain Mulla was born at Lucknow in the North-Western Provinces of British India, in October 1901 and educated at Government Jubilee High School and College there. He won the Sahitya Akademi award in Urdu in 1964 for his poetry, specifically the book Meri Hadis-e-Umr-e-Gurezan. His first collection of poems, Ju-yi shir, published in 1949, was followed by Hans cog and Bamhina bol. He was also a recipient of the Iqbal Samman, a literary award, when aged 92.

His father, Jagat Narain Mulla, was an advocate and government prosecutor. Anand Narain Mulla, a Kashmiri Brahmin, was himself a lawyer. In 1954 he became a judge of the Allahabad High Court, which he remained until 1961.

Mulla was a member of the 4th Lok Sabha (1967–1970), elected as an Independent candidate from the Lucknow constituency. He was later elected as a Rajya Sabha member (1972–1978) as a nominee of the governing Indian National Congress party.

Mulla died in New Delhi on 12 June 1997, aged 96 years.

References

1901 births
1997 deaths
Kashmiri people
Kashmiri writers
Kashmiri Pandits
Kashmiri Brahmins
Indian male poets
Urdu-language poets from India
Recipients of the Sahitya Akademi Award in Urdu
India MPs 1967–1970
Judges of the Allahabad High Court
Rajya Sabha members from Uttar Pradesh
20th-century Indian poets
Poets from Uttar Pradesh
Lok Sabha members from Uttar Pradesh
Politicians from Lucknow
20th-century Indian male writers